Honiton is a civil parish in Devon, England.

Honiton may also refer to:

Places
Honiton, South Australia
Clyst Honiton, a village in Devon, England
Honiton (UK Parliament constituency), a defunct parliamentary constituency of the United Kingdom
Honiton railway station

Institutions
Honiton Town F.C., a football club based in Honiton, England

Arts
Honiton lace, a style of bobbin lace from Honiton, England
Honiton pottery, a type of pottery from Honiton, England